This is a list of many, but not all, of the assassinated Lebanese political figures:

Amine Abouchahine - senior member of the Progressive Socialist Party. Assassinated on 15 July 1975 by a member of the Kataeb Regulatory Forces.
Sheikh Ahmad Assaf - Lebanese Sunni cleric. Assassinated in April 1982. 
Henri Philippe Pharaoun - Member of parliament. Murdered on 6 August 1993.
Saleh al Aridi - a leader of the Lebanese Democratic Party. Assassinated on 10 September 2008.
Dany Chamoun - leader of National Liberal Party, son of Camille Chamoun. Assassinated on 21 October 1990.
Mohamad Chatah - Former Lebanese Finance Minister and critic of Syria and Hezbollah. A senior adviser to the Sunni Future politician Saad Hariri. Assassinated on 27 December 2013.
Mohammad Choucair - adviser to the former President Amine Gemayel. Assassinated on 2 August 1987.
Wissam Eid - an officer in the Internal Security Forces investigating the 2005 Hariri assassination. Assassinated on 25 January 2008.
Walid Eido - parliament Member. Assassinated on 13 June 2007.
Anwar al-Fatayri - member of the PSP and junior commander of the People's Liberation Army.  
Tony Frangieh - son of former President Suleiman Frangieh. Assassinated on 13 June 1978, known as Ehden Massacre. 
Bachir Gemayel - former President-Elect, founder of Lebanese Forces, son of Pierre Gemayel. Assassinated on 14 September 1982.
Pierre Amine Gemayel - Minister of Industry and leader of Kataeb. Assassinated on 21 November 2006.
Antoine Ghanem - parliament Member. Assassinated on 19 September 2007.
Fouad Haddad - Journalist and columnist at the Kataeb Party’s Al Amal newspaper. Kidnapped in Beirut and killed in September 1958.
François al-Hajj - Brigadier General of the Lebanese Army. Assassinated on 12 December 2007.
Nizar al-Halabi - leader of the Sufi Al-Ahbash movement assassinated by members of Osbat al-Ansar on 31 August 1995.
Ragheb Harb - was a Lebanese resistance leader and Muslim cleric. Assassinated on 16 February 1984.
Rafik Hariri and Bassel Fleihan - former Lebanese Prime Minister and Former Minister, respectively. Assassinated on 14 February 2005.
Wissam al-Hassan, head of information branch of the Internal Security Forces. Assassinated on 19 October 2012.
George Hawi - former  secretary general of the Lebanese Communist Party (LCP). Assassinated on 21 June 2005.
Elie Hobeika - militia commander, politician. Assassinated on 24 January 2002.
Ramzi Irani - Lebanese Forces student representative at Lebanese University. Assassinated on 7 May 2002.
Fouad Jumblatt - a leader in the Chouf District, and father of Kamal Jumblatt, later assassinated as well. Assassinated on 6 August 1921.
Kamal Jumblatt - founder of Progressive Socialist Party. Assassinated on 16 March 1977. 
Rashid Karami - former Prime Minister. Assassinated on 1 June 1987. 
Samir Kassir - university professor, journalist and historian. Assassinated on 2 June 2005.
Hassan Khaled - former Grand Mufti of Lebanon's Sunni Muslim community.  Assassinated on 16 May 1989.
 Hassan al-Laqqis- was a military commander of Hezbollah. Assassinated between 3 and 4 December 2013.
Salim Lawzi - journalist. Assassinated some time between 24 February and 6 March 1980. 
 Nasib Al Matni - a Nasserist journalist, assassinated in Beirut on 8 May 1958.
René Moawad - former Lebanese president. Assassinated on 22 November 1989.
Kamel Mrowa - the publisher of Al-Hayat and The Daily Star newspapers. Gunned down at his office in Beirut on 16 May 1966. Mrowa was critical of Gamal Abdel Nasser.
Imad Mughniyah - senior Hezbollah member. Assassinated on 12 February 2008.
Abbas al-Musawi - leader of Hezbollah. Assassinated on 16 February 1992.
Nazem el Qadri - member of the Lebanese Parliament. Assassinated on 22 September 1989. 
Maarouf Saad - Mayor of Sidon and founder of the Popular Nasserist Organization. Shot by a sniper on 26 February 1975 and died on 6 March 1975. See Lebanese Civil War.
Sobhi Saleh - head of the Sunni Islamic Higher Council. Assassinated on October 1986. 
Lokman Slim - was a publisher, political activist and commentator. Assassinated on 4 February 2021.
Riad Al Solh - first prime minister of Lebanon. Assassinated on 17 July 1951.
Riad Taha - journalist and president of the Lebanese Publishers Association. Assassinated on 23 July 1980.   
Gebran Tueni - politician and newspaper editor. Assassinated on 12 December 2005.

See also
 Lebanon bombings and assassinations (2004–present)
 Syrian occupation of Lebanon
 Palestinian insurgency in South Lebanon
 Terrorism in Syria
 Lebanese Civil War

References

Assassinated people
Lebanon
Assassinated people
Lists of Lebanese politicians